Lars-Ingvar Jonas Dahlgren (born 17 February 1966) is a Swedish former footballer who played as a midfielder or forward. He played in Allsvenskan for Halmstads BK, Helsingborgs IF, and Trelleborgs FF.

Playing career

Early career 
Starting off his career with Påarps GIF, Dahlgren signed with Halmstads BK in 1988 and helped the team win the 1988 Division 1 Södra title and win promotion to Allsvenskan by scoring eight goals in 22 games and forming a prolific forward duo together with Stefan Lindqvist. In 1989, he scored six goals in 18 appearances in his first Allsvenskan season.

Helsingborgs IF 
After the 1989 Allsvenskan season, Dahlgren left Halmstad for his hometown club Helsingborgs IF. During the 1992 Division 1 Södra season, he helped Helsingborg win promotion to Allsvenskan together with the prolific forward duo Mats Magnusson and Henrik Larsson. During Helsingborg's first Allsvenskan season in 25 years, Dahlgren played in 24 games and scored four goals. In 1994, he was part of the Helsingborg team that reached the final of the 1993–94 Svenska Cupen, losing to IFK Norrköping in overtime. He left Helsingborgs IF after the 1995 Allsvenskan season, citing family reasons and a wish to be able to spend more time together with his wife and two children.

Dahlgren made a total of 281 appearances for Helsingborgs IF between 1990 and 1995, of which 71 were in Allsvenskan.

Trelleborgs FF 
In May 1996, Trelleborgs FF announced that they had signed Dahlgren for the remainder of the 1996 Allsvenskan season. Dahlgren represented Trelleborg for one season, scoring 2 goals in 15 games.

Honours 
Halmstads BK
 Division 1 Södra: 1988

Helsingborgs IF
 Division 1 Södra: 1992

Individual
 Årets HIF:are (Helsingborgs IF player of the year): 1991

References 

1966 births
Living people
Swedish footballers
Footballers from Skåne County
Helsingborgs IF players
Allsvenskan players
Halmstads BK players
Trelleborgs FF players
Association football midfielders
Sportspeople from Helsingborg